

International badminton events (Grade 1)
 May 20 – 27: 2018 Thomas & Uber Cup (Grade 1) in  Bangkok
 Thomas Cup winners: 
 Uber Cup winners: 
 July 30 – August 5: 2018 BWF World Championships (Grade 1) in  Nanjing
 Singles:  Kento Momota (m) /  Carolina Marín (f)
 Doubles:  (Li Junhui & Liu Yuchen) (m) /  (Mayu Matsumoto & Wakana Nagahara) (f)
 Mixed:  (Zheng Siwei & Huang Yaqiong)
 October 15 – 21: 2018 World University Badminton Championships in  Kuala Lumpur
 November 5 – 18: 2018 BWF World Junior Championships (Individual & Team; Grade 1) in  Markham, Ontario
 Singles:  Kunlavut Vitidsarn (m) /  Goh Jin Wei (f)
 Doubles:  (Di Zijian & Wang Chang) (m) /  (Liu Xuanxuan & Xia Yuting) (f)
 Mixed:  (Leo Rolly Carnando & Indah Cahya Sari Jamil)
 Team: 
 December 12 – 16: HSBC BWF World Tour Finals 2018 in  Guangzhou
 Singles:  Shi Yuqi (m) /  P. V. Sindhu (f)
 Doubles:  (Li Junhui & Liu Yuchen) (m) /  (Misaki Matsutomo & Ayaka Takahashi) (f)
 Mixed:  (Wang Yilyu & Huang Dongping)

Continental badminton events
 February 6 – 11: 2018 Oceania Badminton Championships in  Hamilton, New Zealand
 Singles:  Abhinav Manota (m) /  Chen Hsuan-yu (f)
 Doubles:  (Matthew Chau & Sawan Serasinghe) (m) /  (Setyana Mapasa & Gronya Somerville) (f)
 Mixed:  (Sawan Serasinghe & Setyana Mapasa)
 Men's Team:  (Anthony Joe, Ashwant Gobinathan, Eric Vuong, Jacob Schueler, Matthew Chau, Pit Seng Low, Raymond Tam, Robin Middleton, Ross Smith, Sawan Serasinghe)
 Women's Team:  (Gronya Somerville, Chen Hsuan-yu, Jennifer Tam, Joy Lai, Leanne Choo, Louisa Ma, Setyana Mapasa)
 February 6 – 11: 2018 Badminton Asia Team Championships in  Alor Setar
 Men:  (Mohammad Ahsan, Jonatan Christie, Marcus Fernaldi Gideon, Anthony Sinisuka Ginting, Firman Abdul Kholik, Ihsan Maulana Mustofa, Angga Pratama, Rian Agung Saputro, Hendra Setiawan, Kevin Sanjaya Sukamuljo)
 Women:  (Yuki Fukushima, Sayaka Hirota, Misaki Matsutomo, Aya Ohori, Nozomi Okuhara, Sayaka Sato, Ayaka Takahashi, Shiho Tanaka, Akane Yamaguchi, Koharu Yonemoto)
 February 12 – 15: 2018 All Africa Men's and Women's Team Badminton Championships in  Algiers
 Men:  (Adel Hamek, Adel Meddah, Koceila Mammeri, Majed Yacine Balahoune, Mohamed Abdelaziz Ouchefoun, Mohamed Abderrahime Belarbi, Samy Khaldi, Sifeddine Larbaoui, Youcef Sabri Medel)
 Women:  (Aurelie Marie Elisa Allet, Ganesha Mungrah, Kate Foo Kune, Kobita Dookhee, Nicki Chan-Lam, Sendila Mourat)
 February 13 – 18: 2018 European Men's and Women's Team Badminton Championships in  Kazan
 Men:  (Anders Antonsen, Mads Conrad-Petersen, Mads Pieler Kolding, Emil Holst, Kim Astrup, Mathias Christiansen, Jan Ø. Jørgensen)
 Women:  (Mia Blichfeldt, Kamilla Rytter Juhl, Christinna Pedersen, Line Kjaersfeldt, Maiken Fruergaard, Sara Thygesen, Natalia Koch Rohde)
 February 15 – 18: 2018 Pan Am Badminton Championships (Team) in  Tacarigua
 Men:  (Austin James Bauer, Paul-Antoine Dostie-Gundon, Jason Ho-shue, Jonathan Lai, Ty Alexander Lindeman, Nyl Yakura, Brian Yang, Duncan Yao)
 Women:  (Anne-Julie Beaulieu, Catherine Choi, Michelle Li, Talia Ng, Stéphanie Pakenham, Brittney Tam, Michelle Tong, Josephine Wu)
 April 24 – 29: 2018 Badminton Asia Championships in  Wuhan
 Singles:  Kento Momota (m) /  Tai Tzu-ying (f)
 Doubles:  (Li Junhui & Liu Yuchen) (m) /  (Yuki Fukushima & Sayaka Hirota) (f)
 Mixed:  (Wang Yilyu & Huang Dongping) 
 April 24 – 29: 2018 European Badminton Championships in  Huelva
 Singles:  Viktor Axelsen (m) /  Carolina Marín (f)
 Doubles:  (Kim Astrup & Anders Skaarup Rasmussen) (m) /  (Gabriela Stoeva & Stefani Stoeva) (f)
 Mixed:  (Chris Adcock & Gabby Adcock)
 April 26 – 29: 2018 Pan American Badminton Championships in  Guatemala City
 Singles:  Ygor Coelho /  Michelle Li (f)
 Doubles:  (Jason Ho-shue & Nyl Yakura) (m) /  (Rachel Honderich & Kristen Tsai) (f)
 Mixed:  (Ty Alexander Lindeman & Josephine Wu)
 July 14 – 22: Badminton Asia Junior Championships 2018 in  Jakarta
 Singles:  Lakshya Sen (m) /  WANG Zhiyi (f)
 Doubles:  (DI Zijian & WANG Chang) (m) /  (Febriana Dwipuji Kusuma & Ribka Sugiarto) (f)
 Mixed:  (GUO Xinwa & LIU Xuanxuan)
 Team:  defeated , 3–0 in matches played, in the final.  &  took third place.
 July 18 – 26: 2018 Pan Am Junior Badminton Championships in  Salvador, Bahia
 Singles:  Jonathan Matias (m) /  Talia Ng (f)
 Doubles:  (Ryan Zheng & Winston Tsai) (m) /  (Crystal Lai & Wendy Zhang) (f)
 Mixed:  (Kevin Wang & Wendy Zhang)
 Team:  defeated , 3–2 in matches played, in the final.  took third place.
 September 7 – 16: 2018 European Junior Badminton Championships in  Tallinn
 Singles:  Arnaud Merkle (m) /  Line Christopher (f)
 Doubles:  (Fabien Delrue & William Villeger) (m) /  (Bengisu Ercetin & Nazlıcan Inci) (f)
 Mixed:  (Fabien Delrue & Juliette Moinard)
 Team:  defeated , 3–2 in matches played, in the final. The semifinal loser teams were  & .

2018 BWF Season (Grade 2)
 January 9 – December 2: 2018 BWF Season

 Level Two (Super 1000)
 March 14 – 18: 2018 All England Open in  Birmingham
 Singles:  Shi Yuqi (m) /  Tai Tzu-ying (f)
 Doubles:  (Marcus Fernaldi Gideon & Kevin Sanjaya Sukamuljo) (m) /  (Kamilla Rytter Juhl & Christinna Pedersen) (f)
 Mixed:  (Yuta Watanabe & Arisa Higashino)
 July 3 – 8: 2018 Indonesia Open in  Jakarta
 Singles:  Kento Momota (m) /  Tai Tzu-ying (f)
 Doubles:  (Marcus Fernaldi Gideon & Kevin Sanjaya Sukamuljo) (m) /  (Yuki Fukushima & Sayaka Hirota) (f)
 Mixed:  (Tontowi Ahmad & Liliyana Natsir)
 September 18 – 23: 2018 China Open (final) in  Changzhou
 Singles:  Anthony Sinisuka Ginting (m) /  Carolina Marín (f)
 Doubles:  (Kim Astrup & Anders Skaarup Rasmussen) (m) /  (Misaki Matsutomo & Ayaka Takahashi) (f)
 Mixed:  (Zheng Siwei & Huang Yaqiong)

 Level Three (Super 750)
 June 26 – July 1: Malaysia Open 2018 in  Kuala Lumpur
 Singles:  Lee Chong Wei (m) /  Tai Tzu-ying (f)
 Doubles:  (Takeshi Kamura & Keigo Sonoda) (m) /  (Misaki Matsutomo & Ayaka Takahashi) (f)
 Mixed:  (Zheng Siwei & Huang Yaqiong)
 September 11 – 16: Japan Open 2018 in  Tokyo
 Singles:  Kento Momota (m) /  Carolina Marín (f)
 Doubles:  (Marcus Fernaldi Gideon & Kevin Sanjaya Sukamuljo) (m) /  (Yuki Fukushima & Sayaka Hirota) (f)
 Mixed:  (Zheng Siwei & Huang Yaqiong)
 October 16 – 21: Denmark Open 2018 in  Odense
 Singles:  Kento Momota (m) /  Tai Tzu-ying (f)
 Doubles:  (Marcus Fernaldi Gideon & Kevin Sanjaya Sukamuljo) (m) /  (Yuki Fukushima & Sayaka Hirota) (f)
 Mixed:  (Zheng Siwei & Huang Yaqiong)
 October 23 – 28: French Open 2018 in  Paris
 Singles:  Chen Long (m) /  Akane Yamaguchi (f)
 Doubles:  (Han Chengkai & Zhou Haodong) (m) /  (Mayu Matsumoto & Wakana Nagahara) (f)
 Mixed:  (Zheng Siwei & Huang Yaqiong)
 November 6 – 11: China Masters 2018 (final) in  Fuzhou
 Singles:  Kento Momota (m) /  Chen Yufei (f)
 Doubles:  (Marcus Fernaldi Gideon & Kevin Sanjaya Sukamuljo) (m) /  (Lee So-hee & Shin Seung-chan) (f)
 Mixed:  (Zheng Siwei & Huang Yaqiong)

 Level Four (Super 500)
 January 16 – 21: 2018 Malaysia Masters in  Kuala Lumpur
 Singles:  Viktor Axelsen (m) /  Ratchanok Intanon (f)
 Doubles:  (Fajar Alfian & Muhammad Rian Ardianto) (m) /  (Kamilla Rytter Juhl & Christinna Pedersen) (f)
 Mixed:  (Tang Chun Man & Tse Ying Suet)
 January 23 – 28: 2018 Indonesia Masters in  Jakarta
 Singles:  Anthony Sinisuka Ginting (m) /  Tai Tzu-ying (f)
 Doubles:  (Marcus Fernaldi Gideon & Kevin Sanjaya Sukamuljo) (m) /  (Misaki Matsutomo & Ayaka Takahashi) (f)
 Mixed:  (Zheng Siwei & Huang Yaqiong)
 January 30 – February 4: 2018 India Open in  New Delhi
 Singles:  Shi Yuqi (m) /  Zhang Beiwen (f)
 Doubles:  (Marcus Fernaldi Gideon & Kevin Sanjaya Sukamuljo) (m) /  (Greysia Polii & Apriyani Rahayu) (f)
 Mixed:  (Mathias Christiansen & Christinna Pedersen)
 July 10 – 15: 2018 Thailand Open in  Bangkok
 Singles:  Kanta Tsuneyama (m) /  Nozomi Okuhara (f)
 Doubles:  (Takeshi Kamura & Keigo Sonoda) (m) /  (Greysia Polii & Apriyani Rahayu) (f)
 Mixed:  (Hafiz Faizal & Gloria Emanuelle Widjaja)
 July 17 – 22: 2018 Singapore Open in 
 Singles:  Chou Tien-chen (m) /  Sayaka Takahashi (f)
 Doubles:  (Mohammad Ahsan & Hendra Setiawan) (m) /  (Ayako Sakuramoto & Yukiko Takahata) (f)
 Mixed:  (Goh Soon Huat & Shevon Jemie Lai)
 September 25 – 30: 2018 Korea Open in  Seoul
 Singles:  Chou Tien-chen (m) /  Nozomi Okuhara (f)
 Doubles:  (Hiroyuki Endo & Yuta Watanabe) (m) /  (Misaki Matsutomo & Ayaka Takahashi) (f)
 Mixed:  (He Jiting & Du Yue)
 November 13 – 18: 2018 Hong Kong Open (final) in 
 Singles:  Son Wan-ho (m) /  Nozomi Okuhara (f)
 Doubles:  (Marcus Fernaldi Gideon & Kevin Sanjaya Sukamuljo) (m) /  (Yuki Fukushima & Sayaka Hirota) (f)
 Mixed:  (Yuta Watanabe & Arisa Higashino)

 Level Five (Super 300)
 January 9 – 14: 2018 Thailand Masters in  Bangkok
 Singles:  Tommy Sugiarto (m) /  Nichaon Jindapon (f)
 Doubles:  (Tinn Isriyanet & Kittisak Namdash) (m) /  (Jongkolphan Kititharakul & Rawinda Prajongjai) (f)
 Mixed:  (Chan Peng Soon & Goh Liu Ying)
 February 20 – 25: 2018 Swiss Open in  Basel
 Singles:  Sameer Verma (m) /  Sayaka Takahashi (f)
 Doubles:  (Mathias Boe & Carsten Mogensen) (m) /  (Ayako Sakuramoto & Yukiko Takahata) (f)
 Mixed:  (Mark Lamsfuß & Isabel Herttrich)
 March 6 – 11: 2018 German Open in  Mülheim
 Singles:  Chou Tien-chen (m) /  Akane Yamaguchi (f)
 Doubles:  (Takuto Inoue & Yuki Kaneko) (m) /  (Yuki Fukushima & Sayaka Hirota) (f)
 Mixed:  (Goh Soon Huat & Shevon Jemie Lai)
 May 1 – 6: 2018 New Zealand Open in  Auckland
 Singles:  Lin Dan (m) /  Sayaka Takahashi (f)
 Doubles:  (Chen Hung-ling & Wang Chi-lin) (m) /  (Ayako Sakuramoto & Yukiko Takahata) (f)
 Mixed:  (Wang Chi-lin & Lee Chia-hsin)
 May 8 – 13: 2018 Australian Open in  Sydney
 Singles:  LU Guangzu (m) /  Cai Yanyan (f)
 Doubles:  (Berry Angriawan & Hardianto) (m) /  (Ayako Sakuramoto & Yukiko Takahata) (f)
 Mixed:  (Seo Seung-jae & Chae Yoo-jung)
 June 12 – 17: 2018 U.S. Open in  Fullerton
 Singles:  Lee Dong-keun (m) /  Li Xuerui (f)
 Doubles:  (OU Xuanyi & REN Xiangyu) (m) /  (Tang Jinhua & Yu Xiaohan) (f)
 Mixed:  (Chan Peng Soon & Goh Liu Ying)
 August 28 – September 2: 2018 Spanish Open in  Barcelona
 Singles:  Rasmus Gemke (m) /  Minatsu Mitani (f)
 Doubles:  (Kim Gi-jung & Lee Yong-dae) (m) /  (Mayu Matsumoto & Wakana Nagahara) (f)
 Mixed:  (Niclas Nøhr & Sara Thygesen)
 October 2 – 7: 2018 Chinese Taipei Open in  Taipei
 Singles:  Lee Zii Jia (m) /  Tai Tzu-ying (f)
 Doubles:  (Chen Hung-ling & Wang Chi-lin) (m) /  (Nami Matsuyama & Chiharu Shida) (f)
 Mixed:  (Alfian Eko Prasetya & Marsheilla Gischa Islami)
 October 30 – November 4: 2018 Macau Open in 
 Singles:  Lee Hyun-il (m) /  Michelle Li (f)
 Doubles:  (Kim Gi-jung & Lee Yong-dae) (m) /  (Vivian Hoo Kah Mun & Yap Cheng Wen) (f)
 Mixed:  (Tang Chun Man & Tse Ying Suet)
 November 20 – 25: 2018 Syed Modi International in  Lucknow
 Singles:  Sameer Verma (m) /  Han Yue (f)
 Doubles:  (Fajar Alfian & Muhammad Rian Ardianto) (m) /  (Chow Mei Kuan & Lee Meng Yean) (f)
 Mixed:  (OU Xuanyi & Feng Xueying)
 November 27 – December 2: Korea Masters 2018 (final) in  Gwangju
 Singles:  Son Wan-ho (m) /  Li Xuerui (f)
 Doubles:  (Choi Sol-gyu & Seo Seung-jae) (m) /  (Chang Ye-na & Jung Kyung-eun) (f)
 Mixed:  (Ko Sung-hyun & Eom Hye-won)

 Level Six (Super 100)
 March 27 – April 1: Orleans Masters 2018 in  Orléans
 Singles:  Mark Caljouw (m) /  Shiori Saito (f)
 Doubles:  (Mark Lamsfuß & Marvin Emil Seidel) (m) /  (Gabriela Stoeva & Stefani Stoeva) (f)
 Mixed:  (Niclas Nøhr & Sara Thygesen) 
 April 10 – 15: Lingshui China Masters in  Lingshui
 Singles:  Lin Yu-hsien (m) /  Li Xuerui (f)
 Doubles:  (Han Chengkai & Zhou Haodong) (m) /  (Du Yue & Li Yinhui) (f)
 Mixed:  (GUO Xinwa & LIU Xuanxuan)
 June 19 – 24: Canada Open 2018 in  Calgary
 Singles:  LU Guangzu (m) /  Li Xuerui (f)
 Doubles:  (Marcus Ellis & Chris Langridge) (m) /  (Ayako Sakuramoto & Yukiko Takahata) (f)
 Mixed:  (Marcus Ellis & Lauren Smith)
 July 24 – 29: Japan Masters 2018 in  Akita
 Singles:  Sitthikom Thammasin (m) /  Sayaka Takahashi (f)
 Doubles:  (Akbar Bintang Cahyono & Muhammad Reza Pahlevi Isfahani) (m) /  (Ayako Sakuramoto & Yukiko Takahata) (f)
 Mixed:  (Kohei Gondo & Ayane Kurihara)
 July 24 – 29: Russian Open 2018 in  Vladivostok
 Singles:  Sourabh Verma (m) /  Ho Yen Mei (f)
 Doubles:  (Mohamad Arif Abdul Latif & Nur Mohd Azriyn Ayub) (m) /  (Chisato Hoshi & Kie Nakanishi) (f)
 Mixed:  Vladimir Ivanov &  KIM Min-Kyung
 August 7 – 12: Vietnam Open 2018 in  Ho Chi Minh City
 Singles:  Shesar Hiren Rhustavito (m) /  Yeo Jia Min (f)
 Doubles:  (Ko Sung-hyun & Shin Baek-cheol) (m) /  (Misato Aratama & Akane Watanabe) (f)
 Mixed:  (Nipitphon Phuangphuapet & Savitree Amitrapai)
 September 4 – 9: Hyderabad Open in 
 Singles:  Sameer Verma (m) /  Kim Ga-eun (f)
 Doubles:  (Satwiksairaj Rankireddy & Chirag Shetty) (m) /  (Ng Tsz Yau & Yuen Sin Ying) (f)
 Mixed:  (Akbar Bintang Cahyono & Winny Oktavina Kandow)
 September 18 – 23: 2018 Bangka Belitung Indonesia Masters in  Pangkal Pinang
 Singles:  Ihsan Maulana Mustofa (m) /  Minatsu Mitani (f)
 Doubles:  (Chang Ko-chi & Lu Chia-pin) (m) /  (Ayako Sakuramoto & Yukiko Takahata) (f)
 Mixed:  (Rinov Rivaldy & Pitha Haningtyas Mentari)
 October 9 – 14: Dutch Open 2018 in  Almere
 Singles:  Sourabh Verma (m) /  Mia Blichfeldt (f)
 Doubles:  (Wahyu Nayaka & Ade Yusuf) (m) /  (Gabriela Stoeva & Stefani Stoeva) (f)
 Mixed:  (Marcus Ellis & Lauren Smith)
 October 30 – November 4: SaarLorLux 2018 in  Saarbrücken
 Singles:  Subhankar Dey (m) /  Cai Yanyan (f)
 Doubles:  (Marcus Ellis & Chris Langridge) (m) /  (Gabriela Stoeva & Stefani Stoeva) (f)
 Mixed:  (Marcus Ellis & Lauren Smith)
 November 21 – 25: Scottish Open 2018 (final) in  Glasgow
 Singles:  LIU Haichao (m) /  Kirsty Gilmour (f)
 Doubles:  (Marcus Ellis & Chris Langridge) (m) /  (Gabriela Stoeva & Stefani Stoeva) (f)
 Mixed:  (Marcus Ellis & Lauren Smith)

Leagues
 December 23, 2017 – January 14, 2018: 2017-18 Premier Badminton League in 
 The Hyderabad Hunters defeated the Bengaluru Blasters, 4–3, to win their first Premier Badminton League title.

References

External links
 Badminton World Federation

 
Badminton by year
2018 sport-related lists